Lasse Kolsrud (born March 27, 1959) is a Norwegian actor and director.

He has performed at the Trøndelag Theater, the Norwegian Theater, and on film. He has also directed the theater version of Frode Grytten's novel Bikubesong at the Norwegian Theater. For his dramatization and direction of this play, he received the Hedda Award in the 	Most Promising Newcomer category in 2004.

Kolsrud received the Norwegian Theater Critics Award in 2004.

Filmography
1982: Krypskyttere as Tom, a soldier
1992: Svarte pantere as the defense attorney
1994: Villhesten as Mona's father
1995: Pan as Lieutenant Thomas Glahn
1997: Salige er de som tørster as Håkon Sand
1999: Evas øye as Cordoba
2002: Glasskår as Victor's father

References

External links
 

1959 births
20th-century Norwegian male actors
21st-century Norwegian male actors
Norwegian male actors
Living people